Zabré Airport   is an airport serving Zabré in Burkina Faso.

See also
List of airports in Burkina Faso

References

Airports in Burkina Faso